The 2020 Atlantic 10 men's soccer tournament, was the 22nd edition of the Atlantic 10 Men's Soccer Tournament. It determined the Atlantic 10 Conference's automatic berth into the 2020 NCAA Division I men's soccer tournament. Due to the COVID-19 pandemic, the tournament was postponed from November 2020 to April 2021, with semifinals played on April 15 and the final played on April 17, 2021.

Fordham won the Atlantic 10 championship, for the first time since 2017, defeating George Washington in the final.

Seeds

Bracket

Matches

Semifinals

Final

Statistics

Goalscorers

References

External links 
 2020 Atlantic 10 Men's Soccer Championship

2020
2020 in sports in Ohio
2021 in sports in Ohio
Atlantic 10 Conference Men's Soccer Tournament
Association football events postponed due to the COVID-19 pandemic